Rags to Riches (foaled February 27, 2004, in Kentucky) is a champion American Thoroughbred racehorse who won the 2007 Belmont Stakes, the first filly to win it in over a century.

Background
Rags to Riches is a chestnut mare sired by 1992 U.S. Horse of the Year and U.S. Racing Hall of Fame inductee A.P. Indy. She was out of the mare Better Than Honour, who also produced the 2006 Belmont Stakes winner, Jazil.

Bred by Skara Glen Stables, Rags to Riches was purchased for US$1.9 million in September 2005 at the Keeneland Sales by the partnership of Michael Tabor & Derrick Smith.

Racing career

Early races
Sent to the track at age two under trainer Todd Pletcher, Rags to Riches made her first start in a 4½-furlong sprint in June 2006, finishing fourth.

2007: Three-Year-Old Season
Brought back to competition in January 2007, she won her first race at Santa Anita Park by six lengths. Ridden by Garrett Gomez, in February she won the 8-furlong Las Virgenes Stakes after running five wide for a good part of the race. In March, she drew away to win the 1-mile Grade I Santa Anita Oaks by 5½ lengths. Made the betting favorite for the prestigious Grade I Kentucky Oaks at Churchill Downs, she won by 4¼ lengths over a field that included the 2006 U.S. Champion 2-Yr-Old Filly and Breeders' Cup Juvenile Fillies winner, Dreaming of Anna.

Belmont Stakes
On June 5, 2007, the handlers of Rags to Riches announced that she would run in the third and longest leg of the U.S. Triple Crown, the Belmont Stakes. It was her first start against males.

In the race, Rags to Riches stumbled out of the starting gate but recovered to move within striking distance of the pacesetters. At the top of the stretch, she dueled head-to-head with Preakness Stakes and eventual Horse of the Year winner Curlin. Curlin put his nose in front briefly, but the filly fought back and beat him to the finish line by a head. Rags to Riches' win made her only the third filly to ever win the Belmont and the first since Tanya in 1905. She was also the first filly to win the race at the current 1½-mile distance at Belmont Park. In 1926, the race distance was set at the present ). Tanya's win came 38 years after Ruthless captured the inaugural running of the Belmont in 1867.

Belmont Park track announcer Tom Durkin called the race:

"Here comes Hard Spun. And Curlin is coming through in between horses! And Rags to Riches is coming with a four-wide sweep! And Tiago is in behind them. And at the top of the stretch, a filly is in front at the Belmont! But Curlin is right there with her! These two, in a battle of the sexes at the Belmont Stakes! It is Curlin on the inside – Rags to Riches on the outside. A desperate finish: Rags to Riches and Curlin! They're coming down to the wire. It's gonna be very close! And it's gonna be. ... a filly in the Belmont! Rags to Riches has beaten Curlin and a hundred years of Belmont history! The first filly to win it in over a century!"

Later 2007 season

Despite several minor medical problems over the summer, Rags to Riches continued to train at Belmont Park towards the 2007 Breeder's Cup. She made her return to the races in the $250,000 Gazelle Stakes at Belmont Park on September 15 and finished second to Lear's Princess. It was announced the next day, September 16, that X-rays had revealed a hairline fracture in her right front pastern, and that her trainer, Todd Pletcher, had taken her out of training. She was expected to make a full recovery and return to racing in 2008.

Rags to Riches received several honors at the end of her three-year-old season. Among voters, she was a Teen Choice Award nominee for Choice Female Athlete in 2007. She was also named 2007 World Champion 3-year-old filly by the International Federation of Horseracing Authorities (IFHA).

2008: Four-Year-Old Season
Rags to Riches resumed training at age 4. Then, on March 24, 2008, Todd Pletcher announced that she had re-injured her right front pastern and was retiring. Rags to Riches' career resulted in five wins in seven starts and $1.3 million in earnings.

Breeding career
Rags to Riches was sent to Ashford Stud in Versailles, Kentucky where she had her first foal and was exported to Ireland in 2009. She was returned to America for the 2016 breeding season.

In 2016, she was bred to American Pharoah, but the pairing was not successful, so she was bred to Uncle Mo instead and produced a colt in 2017.

In 2017, she was bred to three-time leading sire Tapit, and producing a colt in 2018.

In 2018, she was bred to Curlin, and produced a colt in 2019.

In 2019, she was bred to American Pharoah, and produced a colt in 2020. He was the first horse to have both parents be Belmont Stakes winners. He has parents who have won the Santa Anita Oaks, Arkansas Derby, Kentucky Oaks, Kentucky Derby, Preakness Stakes, Belmont Stakes (x2), and Breeders' Cup Classic.

Rags to Riches progeny:
 Opulence (foaled March 9, 2009), chestnut mare sired by Giant's Causeway. Opulence did not race. She is a broodmare in Japan with a 2015 Shanghai Bobby gelding named The Bobby, a winning 2016 Verrazano colt named Fort Wadsworth who was sold at Keeneland September to a Japanese owner, a 2017 American Pharoah gelding named Formal Attire, a 2019 American Pharoah colt in Japan named Strike Rich (unplaced in 2 starts), and a 2020 Duramente (JPN) filly named Tiffany Donna. Her 2014 Stay Thirsty colt died before turning a year old, and she did not produce a 2021 foal after being bred to Suave Richard. She is failed to produce a 2022 foal when bred to Kizuna.
 Admirer (foaled March 17, 2010 in Ireland), bay colt by Henrythenavigator. Did not place in one career start and is listed as deceased as of 2019.
  Rhett Butler (foaled March 26, 2011 in Ireland), chestnut colt sired by Galileo. Group I winner and older horse of the year in Serbia. He stands in Serbia at stud as of 2020.
 Rich and Righteous (foaled April 18, 2012 in Ireland), bay gelding sired by Galileo. Broke his maiden in Dubai on dirt, March 2016. Has since retired.
 Never So Few (foaled April 24, 2013 in Ireland), bay horse sired by Galileo. Unplaced in six starts, all in America. Stands stud in South America.
 Rather Special (foaled May 19, 2014 in Ireland), chestnut filly sired by Galileo. Unraced. Produced a 2018 American Pharoah gelding named Grand Revival, who is now competing over hurdles in Europe. She also has a 2019 Uncle Mo filly, a 2020 American Pharoah filly, and 2021 & 2022 Justify fillies, all of which are unnamed. The American Pharoah filly is in training with Todd Pletcher. She was bred to Munnings for 2023.
 Stratification (foaled March 17, 2016 in Kentucky). Chestnut mare sired by Australia. Placed in England, she has since retired, and produced a Justify colt in Japan on March 19, 2021. She was bred back to Lord Kanaloa.
 Bay colt by Uncle Mo (foaled April 30, 2017 in Kentucky).
 Gray or roan gelding by Tapit (foaled in Kentucky in 2018).
 Chestnut colt by Curlin (foaled in Kentucky in 2019).
 Colt by American Pharoah (foaled in 2020).
 Colt by Justify (foaled June 2, 2021).
 Bred to Munnings for a 2023 foal after not being bred for 2022.

In 2016, the New York Racing Association created a new race in her honor, the Rags to Riches Invitational Stakes. It was run on the Friday before the Belmont Stakes at 1½ miles. It was the only dirt race in the U.S. at longer than 1¼ miles for fillies and mares. Theogony won the inaugural running on June 10, defeating four other fillies and mares by eight lengths. The event was held once. Churchill Downs has held the Rags to Riches Stakes since 2013.

Racing Statistics

Pedigree

References

 Rags to Riches' pedigree and racing stats
 "Girl Gone Wild! Rags to Riches Makes Belmont History" New York Racing Association - Belmont Park
 NTRA Stats & Bio
 NTRA Blog
 Teen Choice Nominees announced
 Thoroughbred Times Belmont Contender Article - Rags To Riches
 January 21, 2008 NTRA article titled Rags to Riches is top 3-year-old filly

External links
 ESPN video of the 139th Belmont Stakes

2004 racehorse births
Racehorses bred in Kentucky
Racehorses trained in the United States
Belmont Stakes winners
Eclipse Award winners
Kentucky Oaks winners
Thoroughbred family 8-f